"Launch Party" is the fifth and sixth episode of the fourth season of the American comedy television series The Office, and the show's fifty-eighth and fifty-ninth episode overall. The episode was written by Jennifer Celotta and directed by Ken Whittingham. It first aired in the United States on October 11, 2007 on NBC.

In this episode, Dunder Mifflin prepares for the launch of their new website. Dwight tries to outsell the website, Andy makes a move for Angela, and Michael kidnaps a pizza delivery boy (Kevin McHale).

Plot 
Michael has arranged a meeting to discuss making the Quarterly Report more exciting, unaware that the office workers are more interested in the screensaver, and believes their disappointment whenever the bouncing box doesn't make it into a corner are reactions to his statements. Eventually, the box makes it into a corner, and the cheering employees leave, to his confusion.

Dunder Mifflin is preparing a launch party for their new website. Jan Levinson doesn't want to go so Michael invites Pam Beesly, who makes Jim Halpert take her place. Only after they reach New Jersey does Jim realize that Michael received an invitation to a chat room, not the actual party. Jim reveals he turned down the corporate job that Ryan Howard accepted. Michael returns to Scranton and attempts to plan a better party, irritating party planner Angela Martin, already irritable due to the death of her cat. She takes out her frustrations on fellow Party Planning Committee member Phyllis, who quits the committee.

Dwight Schrute wants to win back Angela's affection by competing against the website to see who can make more sales. Andy Bernard keeps a tally of reams sold, blowing an airhorn whenever Dwight makes a sale. Jim and Pam send Dwight instant messages pretending to be the computer system having achieved self-awareness. Dwight wins the challenge, but when he gloats to Angela she makes it clear they are broken up for good. She asks Pam to set her up with a friend of hers. Pam sends a message as the computer acknowledging Dwight as the superior being. Andy sets up a conference call with his old Cornell friends to serenade Angela with "Take a Chance on Me".

Michael realizes that Ryan doesn't respect him, and on the chat room he snaps that Dwight outsold DMI and curses at Ryan. Everyone complains that Michael confused the office's favorite pizza place, Alfredo's Pizza Cafe, with a terrible pizza place, Pizza by Alfredo. When his coupon is refused he holds the teenaged delivery driver hostage. Eventually realizing he is breaking the law he lets the kid go, then crashes the party in NYC with Dwight. Michael is cheered when a young corporate worker says they liked his rant against Ryan. When Michael points out that it was Dwight who beat the website in sales, the worker says it was funny to see Ryan embarrassed, and the two head home.

Production
"Launch Party" was the sixth episode of the series directed by Ken Whittingham. Whittingham had previously directed "Health Care", "Michael's Birthday", "The Convention", "The Merger", and "Phyllis' Wedding". "Launch Party" was written by Jennifer Celotta, making it the sixth episode written by her.

According to Jennifer Celotta, the idea for the first scene of the episode where the office workers are watching a logo bounce around a television screen, came when the writers were in a room watching the DVD logo bounce around the television screen, and were arguing about whether it would ever hit the corner.

Reception
"Launch Party" received a 5.2 Nielsen Rating and an 8% Share. The episode was watched by 8.91 million viewers and achieved a 4.7/11 in the key adults 18–49 demographic.

"Launch Party" received mixed reviews from critics. TV Squad's Jay Black wondered why the writers "feel the need to veer off into increasingly more ridiculous places", especially because The Office is "hailed by critics and adored by fans for its ability to find humor in the smallest pieces of real-life human interaction". Black did say that except for the kidnapping, he "thought tonight's episode was the best of the season." Travis Fickett of IGN wrote that "Launch Party" was "a very entertaining episode with some terrific moments." Fickett did say that with all the hour-long episodes "things start to feel stretched and some scenes take on a sense of redundancy and certain storylines seem to peter out before they even get going."

References

External links
"Launch Party" at NBC.com

The Office (American season 4) episodes
2007 American television episodes
The Office (American TV series) episodes in multiple parts